32nd London Film Critics Circle Awards
19 January 2012

Film of the Year: 
 The Artist 

British Film of the Year: 
 We Need to Talk About Kevin 

The 32nd London Film Critics Circle Awards, honouring the best in film for 2011, were announced by the London Film Critics Circle on 19 January 2012.

Winners and nominees

Film of the Year
The Artist
Drive
A Separation
Tinker Tailor Soldier Spy
The Tree of Life

British Film of the Year
We Need to Talk About Kevin
The Guard
Kill List
Shame
Tinker Tailor Soldier Spy

Foreign Language Film of the Year
A Separation • IranMysteries of Lisbon • Portugal
Poetry • South Korea
Le Quattro Volte • Italy
The Skin I Live In • Spain

Documentary of the YearSenna
Cave of Forgotten Dreams
Dreams of a Life
Pina
Project Nim

Director of the Year
Michel Hazanavicius – The Artist
Asghar Farhadi – A Separation
Terrence Malick – The Tree of Life
Lynne Ramsay – We Need to Talk About Kevin
Nicolas Winding Refn – Drive

Screenwriter of the Year
Asghar Farhadi – A Separation
Michel Hazanavicius – The Artist
Kenneth Lonergan – Margaret
Alexander Payne, Nat Faxon, and Jim Rash – The Descendants
Bridget O'Connor and Peter Straughan – Tinker Tailor Soldier Spy

Breakthrough British Filmmaker
Andrew Haigh – Weekend
Richard Ayoade – Submarine
Paddy Considine – Tyrannosaur
Joe Cornish – Attack the Block
John Michael McDonagh – The Guard

Actor of the Year
Jean Dujardin – The Artist
George Clooney – The Descendants
Michael Fassbender – Shame
Ryan Gosling – Drive
Gary Oldman – Tinker Tailor Soldier Spy

Actress of the Year
Anna Paquin – Margaret
Meryl Streep – The Iron Lady
Kirsten Dunst – Melancholia
Tilda Swinton – We Need to Talk About Kevin
Michelle Williams – My Week with Marilyn

Supporting Actor of the Year
Kenneth Branagh – My Week with Marilyn
Simon Russell Beale – The Deep Blue Sea
Albert Brooks – Drive
Christopher Plummer – Beginners
Michael Smiley – Kill List

Supporting Actress of the Year
Sareh Bayat – A Separation
Jessica Chastain – The Help
Vanessa Redgrave – Coriolanus
Octavia Spencer – The Help
Jacki Weaver – Animal Kingdom

British Actor of the Year
Michael Fassbender – A Dangerous Method and Shame
Tom Cullen – Weekend
Brendan Gleeson – The Guard
Peter Mullan – Tyrannosaur and War Horse
Gary Oldman – Tinker Tailor Soldier Spy

British Actress of the Year
Olivia Colman – The Iron Lady and Tyrannosaur
Carey Mulligan – Drive and Shame
Vanessa Redgrave – Anonymous and Coriolanus
Tilda Swinton – We Need to Talk About Kevin
Rachel Weisz – The Deep Blue Sea

Young British Performer of the Year
Craig Roberts – Submarine
John Boyega – Attack the Block
Jeremy Irvine – War Horse
Yasmin Paige – Submarine
Saoirse Ronan – Hanna

Technical Achievement
Maria Djurkovic, production design – Tinker Tailor Soldier Spy
Manuel Alberto Claro, cinematography – Melancholia
Paul Davies, sound design – We Need to Talk About Kevin
Dante Ferretti, production design – Hugo
Alberto Iglesias, original score – The Skin I Live In
Chris King and Gregers Sall, editing – Senna
Joe Letteri, visual effects – Rise of the Planet of the Apes
Cliff Martinez, original score – Drive
Robert Richardson, cinematography – Hugo
Robbie Ryan, cinematography – Wuthering Heights

Dilys Powell Award
Nicolas Roeg

References

2
2011 film awards
2011 in British cinema
2011 in London